Hunan University of Technology is a university located in Zhuzhou, Hunan, China. As of April 2014, the university has five campuses, 37,907 students including 1,276 graduate students, and 1,793 faculty members. The university consists of 19 schools, with 60 undergraduate programs and 11 master's degree programs.

HUT is the only university characterized with the higher education of packaging engineering in China. It is a member of International Association of Packaging Research Institutes (IAPRI). As of 2021, Hunan University of Technology was ranked 776th in the world by SCImago Institutions Rankings. The Best Chinese Universities Ranking, also known as the "Shanghai Ranking", placed the university 269th in China. Hunan University of Technology was ranked in the top 901 globally of the 2022 Academic Ranking of World Universities.

History

HUT was founded in 1979 with the name of Zhuzhou Primary University and then Zhuzhou University. Zhuzhou University changed its name to Zhuzhou Institute of Technology (ZIT) in 1989. In 2006, ZIT changed its name as Hunan University of Technology (HUT) with the approval of Ministry of Education of China. In the same year, Hunan Metallurgy College and Zhuzhou Normal College merged into the University.

Academics
 School of Packaging Design and Arts
 School of Packaging and Materials Engineering 
 School of Mechanical Engineering 
 School of Civil Engineering 
 School of Electrical and Information Engineering 
 School of Computer and Communication 
 School of Metallurgical Engineering 
 School of Science
 School of Business
 School of Finance and Economics 
 School of Law 
 School of Literature and Journalism 
 School of Foreign Languages 
 School of Physical Education 
 School of Music 
 School of Architecture and Urban Planning 
 School of International Education 
 Department of Political Studies 
 Institute of Science and Technology (Independent Institute)

Culture
 Motto:

International education
HUT has cooperation and provides exchange programs with universities in USA, UK, and Australia.

Notable alumni

 Liu Zhenwu
 Zhou Bohua

References

External links

HUT Scholarship Programs for International Student

Universities and colleges in Hunan
Educational institutions established in 1979
Zhuzhou
Technical universities and colleges in China
1979 establishments in China